In medicine, jactitation (sometimes jactation) is a restless tossing in bed, seen in severe fevers and certain mental disorders; or more generally a tossing to and fro or jerking and twitching of the body.  It derives ultimately from the Latin jactitare, to toss about.

References

Symptoms and signs: musculoskeletal system